Paul Morrissey (born February 23, 1938) is an American film director, best known for his association with Andy Warhol. He was also director of the first film in which a transgender actress, Holly Woodlawn, starred as a girlfriend of the main character played by Joe Dallesandro in Trash (1970).

Life and career

Of Irish extraction, Morrissey attended Ampleforth College and Fordham University, both Catholic schools, and later served in the United States Army. A political conservative and self-described "right-winger", who has publicly protested against immorality and anti-Catholicism, Morrissey's long-term collaboration with the low-keyed, apparently apolitical Warhol was viewed by many as "a successful mismatch", although both men did share some traits, e.g. both were practicing Catholics from ethnic backgrounds (Warhol was of Rusyn descent). 

Morrissey's bold, avant-garde direction in film making is often attributed to his relationship with Warhol and The Factory, although Morrissey claimed in his memoir, Factory Days, that this is not the case. Morrissey's early works with Warhol took advantage of 16mm news cameras such as the Auricon, which recorded sound directly on film and had the capacity to film takes up to 33 minutes in length. This permitted a portable, small crew method of filming and was amenable to improvisation. 

Morrissey was among the first film directors to cast a transgender woman from Warhol's inner circle in his films Trash (1970) and Women in Revolt (1971).

For an analysis of each of Morrissey's feature films, see Maurice Yacowar, The Films of Paul Morrissey (Cambridge UP).

Filmography
All Aboard the Dreamland Choo-Choo (short) (1964)
About Face (short) (1964)
Like Sleep (short) (1965)
Chelsea Girls (1966)
The Velvet Underground and Nico: A Symphony of Sound (1966) 
I, a Man (1967)
San Diego Surf (1968)
The Loves of Ondine (1968)
Flesh (1968)
Lonesome Cowboys (uncredited) (1968)
Trash (1970)
I Miss Sonia Henie (short) (1971)
Women in Revolt (1971)
Heat (1972)
L'Amour (1973)
Flesh for Frankenstein (1973)
Blood for Dracula (1974)
The Hound of the Baskervilles (1978)
Madame Wang's (1981)
Forty Deuce (1982) 
Mixed Blood (1985)
 (1985)
Spike of Bensonhurst (1988)
Veruschka: A Life for the Camera (documentary) (2005)
A Walk Into the Sea: Danny Williams and the Warhol Factory (documentary) (2007) by Esther Robinson
News From Nowhere (2010)

References

External links
 
 Paul Morrissey's official website
Film Reference extensive analysis of Morrissey's career
 "The Cinema of Paul Morrissey" from Bright Lights Film Journal

1938 births
Living people
American people of Irish descent
American film editors
American Roman Catholics
Fordham University alumni
People educated at Ampleforth College
Film directors from New York City
United States Army soldiers
People associated with The Factory